Rapzilla is a Christian hip hop online magazine. The website contains many sections such as latest news, album reviews, articles, interviews, music downloads, videos, release dates, and columns. Rapzilla is known for its up-to-date news. 

The website's goal is to cover quality Christian hip hop music and bring more exposure to the scene.

History 
Rapzilla was created in 2003 by Philip Rood, a fifteen-year-old missionary child living in Belgium. In 2010, he partnered with Chad Horton, who ran a similar Christian hip hop site called Hip Hop for theSoul, and the two decided to merge their efforts. On 2013, Dove Awards announces partnership with Rapzilla.com.

In 2017, Rood sold his ownership of Rapzilla to Horton, ending his association with the company. In 2019, Rapzilla acquired Christian Hip Hop blog New H2O.

Rating system
According to website owner Chad Horton, reviews by Rapzilla include an averaged rating by the staff in order to weight against any bias by a particular reviewer. Also, any albums that rate lower than 3 or 3.5 are usually not reviewed unless they are highly popular.

Awards & Highlights
2008 Rapzilla's creator receives an Honoree Award, Holy Hip Hop Awards 2008

References

External links
Official website
Official Myspace page
Facebook page
Official Twitter page

Christian hip hop
Contemporary Christian music
Christian music media
Christian websites
Hip hop websites
Internet properties established in 2003
Belgian music websites